Debbie Harry is an American singer and actress who first came to prominence as the lead vocalist of the rock band Blondie in the late 1970s. She subsequently began appearing in art films for Amos Poe,like The Foreigner, before having her first leading role in the neo-noir film  Union City (1980). She next starred opposite James Woods in David Cronenberg's body horror film Videodrome (1983), and had a supporting role in Forever, Lulu (1987). She garnered further notice for her role as Velma Von Tussle in John Waters's satirical dance film Hairspray (1988).

In the 1990s, Harry occasionally starred in independent films, including two films directed by James Mangold's Heavy (1995) and Cop Land (1997). In the 2000s, Harry continued to appear in supporting roles in independent features, with roles in Deuces Wild, Spun (both 2002), and My Life Without Me (2003). In 2008, she appeared in a minor part in Elegy.

In addition to film, Harry has appeared in several television series, including Tales from the Darkside (1987), The Adventures of Pete & Pete (1992), the animated series Phantom 2040 (1994–1995), and Sabrina, the Teenage Witch (1996).

Film

Television

Video games

References

External links

Actress filmographies
American filmographies
filmography